Typhoon Mindulle was a strong tropical cyclone which affected Japan in late August 2016. It was the ninth named storm and the second typhoon of the annual typhoon season in 2016.

Meteorological history

The Japan Meteorological Agency (JMA) indicated that a tropical depression had formed northwest of Guam at noon on August 17. A few hours later, the Joint Typhoon Warning Center (JTWC) quickly issued a Tropical Cyclone Formation Alert and also upgraded the system to a tropical depression with the designation 10W on the same day, based on increased symmetric convection associated with a defined but partially exposed low-level circulation center (LLCC) that was embedded within the southwest monsoon surge. One day later, the JTWC upgraded 10W to a tropical storm via the Dvorak technique, with the winds proved by a recent scatterometer pass. The JMA upgraded the system to a tropical storm and named it Mindulle early on August 19, when central convection had become more organized. However, an upper-level low to the north and the predecessor of Tropical Storm Kompasu to the northeast were stifling the development of any poleward outflow.

Moving on the eastern edge of a relatively high-latitude monsoon gyre and being steered by the southern extension of the subtropical ridge anchored east of Japan, the intensification of Mindulle was limited on August 20, owing to modest dry air entrainment resulting in flaring convection near and surrounding the LLCC. At around 12:30 JST (03:30 UTC), Mindulle made landfall over the area near Tateyama, Chiba.

Preparations and impact

While Mindulle was in its developmental stages, the Guam National Weather Service office issued a tropical storm watch for Tinian and Saipan. On the islands, the storm produced gusty winds and showers.

Across the Kantō Plain, about 850,000 people were ordered to evacuate. In Kanagawa and Tokyo prefectures, officials issued landslide watches. On Hokkaido, more than 2,700 people evacuated due to Mindulle. Ahead of the storm, Narita International Airport – Tokyo's main airport – was closed, causing 425 flights to be canceled, affecting tens of thousands of travelers. Hundreds of Japan Railway trains were also canceled. American military bases in Japan were set at Tropical Cyclone Condition of Readiness (TCCOR) 1, and non-essential people were directed to stay in their lodgings after most services were shut down.

The offshore islands of Hachijō-jima and Izu Ōshima both reported  of precipitation in just one hour, which is about half the average August rainfall for both locations. In the capital city Tokyo, Mindulle dropped  of rainfall, which is 66% of the average August rainfall. Narita Airport recorded winds of 126 km/h (78 mph), which forced air traffic controllers to evacuate the control tower. This was the first time the tower was evacuated due to a typhoon, and only the second time in its history after the 2011 Japan earthquake.

Floods from Mindulle's heavy rainfall submerged a tunnel along the Chūō Expressway in Tokyo. Portions of Naval Air Facility Atsugi, Yokota Air Base, and Camp Zama were flooded, with runways submerged. At Yokota Air Base, the floods cut off power to five housing towers, forcing the occupants to evacuate. Floodwaters covered roads and damaged homes in Hokkaido, and a man drowned in Kitami, days after floods from Kompasu also killed a man on Hokkaido. A woman in Sagamihara outside Tokyo also drowned during the storm. Nationwide, Mindulle's effects injured 61 people. Across southeastern Honshu, 15 rivers flooded, and a train line was washed out in western Tokyo, forcing a train of commuters to evacuate. High winds knocked a tree onto a central Tokyo train station, which suspended service on the Tokyo Loop Line. Fallen power lines left over 100,000 people without power, mostly in Chiba Prefecture.

Total financial loss in Japan, along with Tropical Storm Kompasu, were counted to be ¥45 billion (US$448 million).

See also

Other storms of the same name
Tropical Storm Talas (2011)
Typhoon Man-yi (2013)
Typhoon Phanfone (2014)
Tropical Storm Etau (2015)

References

External links

Tropical Cyclone Information of Typhoon Mindulle (1609) from the Japan Meteorological Agency
Joint Typhoon Warning Center
JMA General Information of Typhoon Mindulle (1609) from Digital Typhoon

10W.MINDULLE from the U.S. Naval Research Laboratory

2016 in Japan
2016 Pacific typhoon season
August 2016 events in Asia
Typhoons in Japan
Mindulle